Fluxinella stirophora is a species of extremely small deep water sea snail, a marine gastropod mollusk in the family Seguenziidae.

Description
The height of the shell attains 4.1 mm.

Distribution
This marine species occurs off New Caledonia.

References

 Marshall B. A. (1991)  Mollusca Gastropoda: Seguenziidae from New Caledonia and the Loyalty Islands, in CROSNIER A & BOUCHET P. (eds) Résultats des Campagnes MUSORSTOM, Volume 7. Mémoires du Muséum national d’Histoire naturelle 150: 41-109.

External links
 To Encyclopedia of Life
 To World Register of Marine Species
 

stirophora
Gastropods described in 1991